Gustave Foëx (Gustave Louis Émile Foëx, born in Marseille in 1844 - died in 1906) was a French ampelographer and a colleague of Pierre Viala.

Gustave Foex who was Director of the National School of Agriculture of Montpellier (French: École nationale d’agriculture de Montpellier, now known as Supagro) from 1881 to 1897 was a professor of viticulture here from 1870 to 1896 and he created the school vineyard in 1876 to test the American vine-stock's resistance to phylloxera). At the end of the 19th century, Montpellier was recognized to be THE European centre for studying vines, attracting both eminent researchers and viticulture specialists to the school.

Works 
 Les vins américains : 1er rapport de la dégustation : 2ème rapport sur la composition des vins américains par M. J. Leenhardt-Pomier / M. Saintpierre et Foëx / Montpellier : impr.Centrale du Midi, 1875
 Programme des études pratiques de viticulture et d'ampélographie : 1° Rapport à M. le préfet de l'Hérault par M. Camille Saintpierre, par M. Foex, ... / Montpellier : C. Coulet, 1876
 Rapport à M. le Directeur de l'Ecole d'Agriculture de Montpellier sur les expériences de viticulture entreprises par M. Foex,... ; Ecole nationale supérieure agronomique de Montpellier, Laboratoire d'agriculture et de viticulture / Montpellier : C. Coulet, 1879
 Causes de la résistance des vignes américaines aux attaques du phylloxéra : Ecole nationale d'agriculture de Montpellier, Station viticole par M. G. Foéx / Montpellier : Boehm et fils, 1879
 Catalogue des vignes américaines et asiatiques et des ampélopsis cultivées dans les collections en 1879...[Ecole Nationale d'Agriculture de Montpellier] par M.G. Foëx / Montpellier : C. Coulet, 1879
 Manuel pratique de viticulture pour la reconstitution des vignobles méridionaux : vignes américaines, submersion, plantation dans les sables par M. Gustave Foex / Montpellier : Camille Coulet, 1881
 Manuel pratique de viticulture pour la reconstitution des vignobles méridionaux : vignes américaines, submersion, plantation dans les sables par M. Gustave Foëx / Deuxième édition, revue et considérablement augmentée / Montpellier : Camille Coulet, 1882
 Instructions sur l'emploi des vignes américaines à la reconstitution des vignobles de l'Hérault par Gustave Foëx ; sur ordre du Conseil Général de l'Hérault / Montpellier : Boehm et fils, 1882
 Mémoire sur les causes de la chlorose chez l'herbemont / Gustave Foex...... / Montpellier : Camille Coulet, 1882
 Instructions relatives à l'établissement des pépinières de vignes américaines par G. Foëx, Directeur de l'Ecole Nationale d'Agriculture de Montpellier / Paris : Imprimerie Nationale, 1883
 Manuel pratique de viticulture pour la reconstitution des vignobles méridionaux par M. Gustave Foëx / 3e éd. / Montpellier : Coulet, 1884
 Ampélographie américaine : Description des variétés les plus intéressantes de vignes américaines, avec une introduction à l'étude de la vigne américaine par M. Gustave Foe͏̈x,... M. Pierre Viala,... / 2ème édition / Montpellier : aux bureaux du "Progrès agricole et viticole , (1885)
 Catalogue des ampélidées cultivées à l'Ecole Nationale d'Agriculture de Montpellier (1884) par G. Foex Directeur et professeur de viticulture. / Montpellier : Typographie et lithographie Bohem et fils , 1885
 Le Mildiou ou Peronospora de la vigne. Montpellier, Coulet ; Paris, Delahaye, 1885. (with Pierre Viala).
 Cours complet de viticulture 44. 1886
 Les vignes américaines et les maladies de la vigne : conférences par M. Gustave Foex / Genève : Athénée , 1887
 Manuel pratique de viticulture pour la reconstitution des vignobles méridionaux : vignes américaines, submersion, plantation dans les sables par Gustave Foex / 4e éd. revue et considérablement augm / Montpellier : C. Coulet , 1887
 Création de pépinières départementales : Rapport sur la reconstitution par les cépages américains des vignes phylloxérées, et instructions relatives au traitement du mildiou par M. Foëx.... ; Département du Doubs. / Besançon : impr. de Millot frères , 1888
 Cours complet de viticulture par M. Gustave Foëx,... / 2e éd. revue et considérablement augmentée / Montpellier : Camille Coulet , 1888
 Le "Rot" blanc ou "Coniothyrium diplodiella par G. Foëx,... et L. Ravaz / Montpellier : C. Coulet, 1888
 Rapport sur le plâtrage des vins par G. Foëx / Montpellier : C. Coulet, 1888
 Catalogue des ampélidées cultivées à l'Ecole Nationale d'Agriculture de Montpellier (1889) par G. Foex,... / Montpellier : Typographie et lithographie Charles Boehm, 1889
 Carnet de notes ampélographiques, destiné aux élèves de l'école nouvelle d'agriculture de Montpellier par M. G. Foëx, directeur et professeur de viticulture. / Montpellier : Impr. Serre et Ricome, 1890
 Manuel pratique de viticulture pour la reconstitution des vignobles méridionaux : vignes américaines, submersion, plantation dans les sables par Gustave Foëx,... / 5e éd. revue et considérablement augmentée / Montpellier : C. Coulet, 1891
 Cours complet de viticulture par G. Foëx,.. / 3e édition, revue et considérablement augmentée avec 6 cartes en chromo hors texte et 575 gravures dans le texte / Montpellier : C. Coulet, 1891
 Cours complet de viticulture par M. G. Foëx,... / 4e éd., revue et considérablement augmentée... / Montpellier : C. Coulet, 1895
 Comment devons-nous reconstituer nos vignobles ? : Les vignobles nouveaux, emploi des vignes Américaines par M. Gustave Foëx ... / Deuxième édition / Paris : E. Brocheriouxt, 1899
 Manuel pratique de viticulture pour la reconstitution des vignobles méridionaux : Vignes américaines, submersion, plantation dans les sables par M. Gustave Foëx ... / 6ème édition, / Montpellier : C. Coulet, 1899
 Historique de la crise phylloxérique en France : exposition universelle de 1900 : congrès international de viticulture, 13-17 juin 1900, Paris par G. Foex,... / Paris : Société anonyme de publications périodiques, 1900
 La vinificación moderna : ¿Cómo debemos debemos hacer nuestro vino? por Gustave Foëx / Santiago de Chile : Impr. moderna, 1900
 Los viñedos nuevos : ¿Cómo debemos reconstituir nuestros viñedos? por Gustave Foëx / Santiago de Chile : Impr. moderna, 1900
 La vinificación moderna : ¿Cómo debemos hacer nuestro vine ? Gustave Foex ; Trad. al castellano y anot. en lo que se refieremás particularmente a Chile i Sud-América por Gaston Lavergne / Santiago de Chile : Impr. y lit. Franco-chilena, 1902-1903

References

External links 
 

19th-century French botanists
1844 births
1906 deaths
20th-century French botanists